Johannes Gouws Prinsloo (born 19 July 1990 in East London, South Africa) is a South African rugby union footballer. His regular playing position is fullback.

Career

In 2013, he joined  prior to the 2013 Currie Cup Premier Division season. In July 2014, he extended his contract until the end of 2015.

In 2016, he joined French Fédérale 1 side Bobigny.

References

External links

itsrugby.co.uk Profile

1990 births
Living people
Afrikaner people
Griquas (rugby union) players
Rugby union fullbacks
Rugby union players from East London, Eastern Cape
Sharks (Currie Cup) players
South African rugby union players